The Camăr is a right tributary of the river Barcău in Romania. It discharges into the Barcău in Balc.

References

Rivers of Romania
Rivers of Sălaj County
Rivers of Bihor County